The Myer Centre is a multi-storied retail building located between the Queen Street Mall and Elizabeth Street in Brisbane, Queensland, Australia named after Myer, its largest tenant. It is a nine-floor shopping complex which includes Queensland's largest Myer department store. It was Australia's largest central business district retail development until 1991 when superseded by Adelaide's Myer Centre.

Stores
The Myer Centre is currently home to approximately 180 stores. Upon opening in 1988 it housed 230 stores including Australia's second-largest Myer department store. The Myer Centre stores are open to the public seven days a week.

Layout

Due to the hilly landscape of the Brisbane CBD, The Myer Centre's floors are labelled differently from that of most shopping centres.  Whereas many shopping centres label their floors purely by number (level 1, level 2, etc.) or its vertical position (lower level, upper level, etc.), The Myer Centre is laid out in the following fashion (lowest level to highest):

Level S (named after the Sizzler restaurant): Sizzler
Level T (Lower Target level (formerly), one lift only): no longer open to the general public
Level A (Albert Street entrance): Queen Street bus station, Target, food court
Level E (Elizabeth Street entrance): Coles Central, food court, specialty stores
Level Q (Queen Street entrance): Myer (Beauty Floor), specialty stores
Level 1 (first floor above any street level): Myer (Women's Floor), Lincraft, specialty stores
Level 2 (second floor above street levels): Myer (Men's Floor), DVD King, Daiso, Lincraft, Best & Less,  Oxfam Shop,  Skinnys
Level 3 (third floor above street levels): Myer (Homewares and Children's Floor) (accessed from within store only), Event Cinemas
Level 4 (fourth floor above street levels): Myer (Home Entertainment Floor) (accessed from within store only)
Level R (two lifts only): Centre Management

History
The Myer Centre shopping complex opened for trading on 28 March 1988 (just in time for Brisbane's World Expo '88) and Myer relocated its Brisbane department store into it. More than 500,000 customers visited within the first four days of operation. 

Previously, the original Brisbane Myer store extended from Queen Street to Adelaide Street, with entrances at both ends. That old location was on the opposite side of Queen Street to its current location in The Myer Centre. The old store was split in half by Burnett Lane and the arcade through today's Queen Adelaide Building used to be the main thoroughfare through the old Myer store. Myer purchased that original location from the Allan and Stark department store. The Allan and Stark Building are heritage listed. Originally, one of the entrances opened onto the busy Queen Street, before it was pedestrianised to become the Queen Street Mall in 1982.

The construction project by REMM Group Ltd went for 18 months, and required excavation of 375,000 cubic metres of earth, to a depth of 22 metres (eight metres below the Brisbane River level), which was the largest urban excavation in Australia at that time. The design emphasised a Victorian theme, utilising ornate railing and fittings in brass and green, with terrazzo floor tiles.   

Previously located on the site were four historic buildings of the Hotel Carlton (1885), New York Hotel (1860), Newspaper House, from which the Brisbane Telegraph was first published, and the Barry and Roberts department store.  Using facadism, the facades of those buildings have been retained and restored.

In November 1998 the Myer Centre was purchased by Gandel Retail Trust for $371 million, making it the second largest property transaction in Australia's history at that time.

The top floor of the centre was a fun park, Top's, until it was demolished and replaced by a cinema in 2000. The fun park comprised various small shops, an amusement centre, a swing ship, a dragon train, and a Ferris wheel. When the theme park was operating, screams of excitement and terror could be heard from the patrons of both the swing ship and the dragon train. Prior to 2000, the cinemas were originally situated in the area now occupied by Target on one level only, and operated by Hoyts.

In the past, the centre's tenants included fairly substantial nightclubs. In the early 1990s, the basement area (subsequently occupied by Sizzler) hosted "The Funkyard", a nightspot with an emphasis on the "alternative" guitar rock of the era. The Funkyard hosted live gigs; for example, the U.S. band Dark Carnival played there, with Ron Asheton of the Stooges on guitar. Another former tenant of the centre which played host to live music was the "Metropolis" nightclub, adjacent to the bus tunnel on Level "A", near the place now occupied by glamour photography shop "Starshots". Irish "shoegaze" band My Bloody Valentine played at Metropolis in 1991, supported by Straitjacket Fits (from New Zealand) and the Underground Lovers.

In 2005 the centre was purchased by Colonial First State Property group as part of the purchase of Gandels Centres.

The centre was valued at A$732 million in 2012 when ISPT purchased a half stake.

On 8 March 2013, the front of the Myer Centre was the scene of an hour-long siege. The gunman was subdued by police using rubber bullets.

Transport

Car
The Myer Centre has Brisbane CBD's largest car park with 1,450 undercover car park bays and on-site staff available 24 hours a day. The car park uses Park Assist technology to guide drivers to an available bay and help find their car if the driver can't locate it on their return.

Bus
The Myer Centre is also one of the bus transit hubs for the Brisbane CBD. Many bus routes commence and terminate under the Myer Centre at the Queen Street bus station on the Albert Street level of the complex.

Train
The Myer Centre is also within easy walking distance of three railway stations:
 Central Station
 South Brisbane Station
 Roma Street Station.

References

External links
The Myer Shopping Centre — official website

 

Shopping centres in Brisbane
Queen Street, Brisbane
Elizabeth Street, Brisbane
Albert Street, Brisbane